Opera Holland Park is a summer opera company which produces an annual season of opera performances, staged under a temporary canopy in front of the remains of Holland House, a Blitz-damaged building in Holland Park, west central London. The venue is fully covered but is open at the sides.

The canopy was installed in 1988 and was initially used for a variety of music. Concerns about noise levels led to an increasing focus on opera from 1989, with productions staged by a variety of small opera companies. For the 2007 season, the theatre was expanded by the addition of a spectacular new canopy underneath which is new seating and other improved facilities. There are now 1,000 seats.

As part of a drive to improve artistic standards "Opera Holland Park" was established in 1996 to produce all future productions, and in recent years the company has enjoyed a long string of hits with major achievements in productions of more obscure repertoire such as Mascagni's Iris, Cilea's L'arlesiana, and many others. It is now considered one of the most accomplished non-state opera companies in the UK. The resident orchestra is the City of London Sinfonia.

Each season around half a dozen operas are staged. Most of them are well known classics but the company has developed a reputation for producing works from the verismo repertoire and an adventurous production policy.  They are sung in the original language and surtitling is used.

Opera Holland Park was named Best Opera Company 2010 by The Sunday Times (London).

Management and organization
Until October 2015, the company was a part of, and received financial backing from, the Royal Borough of Kensington and Chelsea, plus a number of corporate sponsors, including Investec Wealth & Investment, the season's title sponsor.

The company became an independent charity in October 2015, receiving a significant final grant settlement from The Royal Borough. A new board was installed, chaired by Charles Mackay CBE, former chairman of Historic Royal Palaces.

There is also a vibrant Friends organisation attached to the company who raise significant funds for development and who perform a central educational role as well. There are over 2000 Friends of the company as well as nearly 100 elite donors called  "Ambassadors" and a new troupe called Founders, created on independence from the Royal Borough.

The company is characterised by the two people who run it: Michael Volpe (General Director) and James Clutton (Director of Opera).

In 2007 the company produced Italo Montemezzi's thrilling rarity L'amore dei tre re to great acclaim. The production was regarded as one of the most exciting in the company's history. In the same season OHP's production of Janáček's Jenůfa was widely regarded as one of the best realisations of the opera ever seen in London.

In March 2008, Opera Holland Park's 2007 season was nominated in the category of Concert Series and Festival in the Royal Philharmonic Society Music Awards.

The 2009 season included Janáček's Káťa Kabanová and Donizetti's Roberto Devereux, while 2010 plans included Pelléas et Mélisande and Zandonai's Francesca da Rimini in addition to four  or five standard operas each season. The 2011 season includes productions of three major Italian rarities, Mascagni's L'Amico Fritz, Puccini's La Rondine and Catalani's La Wally.

In 2009 Nicholas Paget-Brown launched the Cultural Placemaking initiative  as part of the Council's Arts and Culture Policy. He explained that the plan was to build on the work of Opera Holland Park and Leighton House Museum to develop a broader coherent strategy to encourage developers to consider the Council's creative and artistic ambitions when working on a development project.

Film Appearance
Opera Holland Park was featured in Woody Allen's 2010 film You Will Meet a Tall Dark Stranger in a scene using main cast members Anthony Hopkins, Josh Brolin, Naomi Watts and Lucy Punch.

See also
List of opera festivals

References

External links
Opera Holland Park Official website
Images of the venue

British opera companies
Holland Park
Opera festivals
Opera in London
Parks and open spaces in the Royal Borough of Kensington and Chelsea
Opera in the United Kingdom